Laurel and Hardy is a 1966-1967 American animated television series and an updated version of Stan Laurel and Oliver Hardy's comedic acts by the animation studio Hanna-Barbera and Larry Harmon Productions. Harmon had been developing the series since 1961, while Stan Laurel was still alive, although Laurel had very little involvement.

A total of 156 shorts were made, each having its own opening and closing wrap-arounds, to make them easy to air in syndication. As Oliver Hardy and Stan Laurel had died in 1957 and 1965 respectively, Jim MacGeorge provided the voice of Ollie, while Harmon voiced Stan. They would later reprise their roles in an episode of The New Scooby-Doo Movies.

Reception 
The one-season show was not well received. Critic Leonard Maltin said, "To criticize these cartoons is pointless. Any imitation, even a good one, simply cannot be Laurel and Hardy... No one can duplicate Laurel and Hardy's greatness because they were unique."

Voices
Larry Harmon - Stan Laurel
Jim MacGeorge - Oliver Hardy
Additional Voices: Hal Smith, Don Messick, Janet Waldo, Paul Frees, Doug Young, Allan Melvin

Episodes

 1. Can't Keep a Secret Agent 
 2. Mutt Rut
 3. How Green Was My Lawn Mower
 4. Prairie Panicked
 5. Missile Hassle
 6. No Moose Is A Good Moose
 7. The Bullnick
 8. High Fly Guys
 9. False Alarms
 10. Hillbilly Bully
 11. Ball Maul
 12. Handle with Care
 13. You And Your Big Mouse
 14. Sitting Roomers
 15. Babes in Sea Land
 16. Rome Roamers
 17. Rocket Wreckers
 18. Hot Rod Hardy
 19. Knight Mare
 20. Defective Story
 21. Crash & Carry
 22. Desert Knights
 23. Tale of a Sale
 24. Fancy Trance
 25. Suspect in Custody
 26. Auto-Matic Panic
 27. Shiver Mr. Timbers
 28. Stand Out, Stand In
 29. Big Bear Bungle
 30. Shrinking Shrieks
 31. Mounty Rout
 32. Bond Bombed
 33. What Fur?
 34. Spook Loot
 35. Camera Bugged
 36. Plumber Pudding
 37. Robust Robot
 38. Vet Fret
 39. Copper Bopper

 40. Feud For Thought
 41. Love Me, Love My Puppy 
 42. Squawking Squatter
 43. Goofy Gopher Goof-Up
 44. Sassy Sea Serpent
 45. Wacky Quackers
 46. Truant Ruined
 47. Country Buzzin'
 48. Naps & Saps
 49. Bad Day In Baghdad
 50. The Missing Fink
 51. Always Leave 'Em Giggling
 52. Badge Budgers
 53. Two for the Crow
 54. Good Hoods
 55. Animal Shelter
 56. Tragic Magic
 57. Ring-A-Ding King
 58. Ups & Downs
 59. Beanstalk Boobs
 60. Leaping Leprechaun
 61. Tourist Trouble
 62. The Genie Was Meanie
 63. Mars Little Helper 
 64. Curfew For Kids
 65. Lion Around
 66. Shoot-Down at Sundown
 67. Horse Detectives
 68. The Two Musketeers
 69. Ali Boo Boo
 70. Ghost Town Clowns
 71. Hurricane Hood
 72. Ride and Seek
 73. Tee Pee TV
 74. Shoe-Shoe Baby
 75. Train Strain
 76. Monster Bash
 77. Say Uncle, Ants
 78. Kitty Pity

 79. Frigid-Ray-Gun
 80. Southern Hospital-Ity
 81. Frog Frolic
 82. Shutter Bugged
 83. Circus Run Aways
 84. Witch Switch
 85. Pie in the Sky
 86. Slipper Slip-Up
 87. Sign of the Times
 88. Two Many Cooks
 89. Flea's A Crowd
 90. Dingbats
 91. We Clothe at Five
 92. The Stone Age Kid
 93. Quick Change
 94. Whing Ding
 95. Termite Might
 96. To Bee or Not to Bee
 97. Mistaken Identi-Tree
 98. Rodeo Doug
 99. Pet Shop Polly
 100. Laff Staff
 101. Try and Get It
 102. Riverboat Detectives
 103. Unhealthy Wealthy
 104. Honesty Always Pays
 105. Plant Rant
 106. Sky-High Noon
 107. Get Tough
 108. Handy Dandy Diary
 109. Jumpin Judo 
 110. They Take The Cake
 111. Gold Storage
 112. Lots of Bad Luck
 113. Kangaroo Kaper
 114. The Finks Robbery
 115. Strictly for the Birds
 116. Birds of a Feather
 117. Bird Brains

 118. Switcheroony
 119. Mechanical Mess-Up
 120. Horsey Sense
 121. Bowling Boobs
 122. Dog Tired
 123. Wayout Campers
 124. Goofer Upper Golfers
 125. My Friend the Inventor
 126. Hard Day's Work
 127. Sky-Scraper-Scape
 128. Sleepy King
 129. Fair Play
 130. Fly Foot Flat Feet
 131. Baboon Tycoon
 132. A Real Live Wife
 133. Wishy Washy Fishy Tale
 134. Stuporman
 135. Wheel and Deal Seal
 136. Wolf in Sheep's Clothing
 137. Lumber Jerks
 138. That's Snow Biz
 139. A Clothes Call
 140. Boot Hill Bill
 141. Stop Action Faction
 142. Molecule Rule
 143. Peek A Boo Pachyderm
 144. Mummy Dummy
 145. Nitey Knight
 146. Fly Spy
 147. Franken-Stan 
 148. A Real Tycoon
 149. Puppet Show Down 
 150. Madcap Mischief
 151. Secret Agents 000
 152. Flight of the Bumble-Brains
 153. Salt Water Daffy
 154. From Wrecks to Riches
 155. Truant or Consequences
 156. Flipped Van Winkles

Comic book
From 1969–1974, Thorpe & Porter in the United Kingdom published a color comic book series based on the Laurel & Hardy cartoon, which lasted 141 issues The cover for the unpublished second issue appears in The DC Vault.

Home media
Congress Video Group released two volumes containing episodes from this cartoon series.
Volume 1 contained the following episodes: "Can't Keep a Secret Agent", "How Green Was My Lawn Mower", "Handle With Care", "Camera Bugged", "Plumber Pudding", and "Robust Robot".
Volume 2 contained the following episodes: "Copper Bopper", "Feud For Thought", "Love Me, Love My Puppy",  "Squawking Squatter", "Goofy Gopher Goof-Up", and "Sassy Sea Serpent".

On November 6, 2012, France released a four-disc DVD set of the complete series; it included 68 episodes in English with French subtitles.

In 1988 Video Gems released a video called Crash & Carry with 10 cartoons on (Episodes 21-30) and another one called Can't keep a secret agent with the first 10 cartoons on it (Episodes 1-10).

In 1989 Parkfield Entertainment released 3 volumes of cartoons.  The first 2 volumes has 12 cartoons each and volume 3 has 16 cartoons on it. (Volume 1 Episodes 51-60 & 71-72)  (volume 2 Episodes 61-70 & 73-74) 
(volume 3 Episodes 81-96).

In 1991 Gemini Entertainment LTD released a video called Always leave 'em giggling with 12 cartoons on it.  The first 10 cartoons are the same as volume 1 and the last 2 cartoons are the first 2 cartoons on volume 2. (Episodes 51-62).

See also
 List of works produced by Hanna-Barbera Productions
 List of Hanna-Barbera characters
 The New Three Stooges
 The Abbott and Costello Cartoon Show
 The New Scooby-Doo Movies

References

External links

Episode guide at the Big Cartoon DataBase

1960s American animated television series
1960s American children's comedy television series
1966 American television series debuts
1967 American television series endings
American children's animated comedy television series
Animation based on real people
Cultural depictions of Laurel & Hardy
Television shows adapted into comics
Television series by Hanna-Barbera
First-run syndicated television programs in the United States